The Umbrellas may refer to:

The Umbrellas (Christo and Jeanne-Claude), 1991 environmental artwork by Christo and Jeanne-Claude
The Umbrellas (Renoir), 1883 painting by Pierre-Auguste Renoir
The Umbrellas (jazz ensemble), Australian jazz band
Umbrellas (band), American indie band

See also
Umbrella (disambiguation)
The Umbrellas of Cherbourg, a 1964 musical film